Dorothy Shephard (born ) is a Canadian politician, who was elected to the Legislative Assembly of New Brunswick in the 2010 provincial election. She represents the electoral district of Saint John Lancaster as a member of the Progressive Conservatives. She was born and raised in Saint John.

Shephard served as Minister of Healthy and Inclusive Communities in the Alward government from 2012 to 2014. In 2018, she was appointed Minister of Social Development in the Higgs government. In 2020 she was appointed Minister of Health, and in 2022 she was returned to the post of Minister of Social Development.

Shephard was re-elected in the 2014, 2018 and 2020 provincial elections. Prior to becoming involved in politics, she owned and operated Benjamin Moore Colour Centre, a retail decorating store, for 17 years.

Election results

References

Progressive Conservative Party of New Brunswick MLAs
Politicians from Saint John, New Brunswick
Women MLAs in New Brunswick
Living people
21st-century Canadian politicians
21st-century Canadian women politicians
Women government ministers of Canada
Members of the Executive Council of New Brunswick
1960s births